LNH may refer to:

 Ligue Nationale de Hockey, the French name for the National Hockey League
 Ligue Nationale de Handball, the governing body of men's professional team handball in France
 Dirac large numbers hypothesis, a hypothesis in cosmology
 Lanoh language, ISO 639-3 code lnh
 Lanhsa Airlines, ICAO code LNH
 Luftnachrichtenhelferinnen (LNH), a designation in the German Women's Auxiliary Services
 Laku noć, Hrvatska (Good Night Croatia), a satirical Croatian-language cartoon